Shawver is an unincorporated community in Fayette and  Greenbrier counties, West Virginia, United States.

Shawver most likely is a corruption of Schaeffer.

References

Unincorporated communities in Fayette County, West Virginia
Unincorporated communities in Greenbrier County, West Virginia
Unincorporated communities in West Virginia